Sandie was a British girls' comic, published by Fleetway, which lasted for 89 weekly issues between 12 February 1972 and 20 October 1973 before being merged into Tammy. The editor of Sandie was John Wagner. 

Like many comics of its kind, the strips in Sandie focused on school, ballet, dogs and horses, and girl-next-door themes. Stories of girls confronting adversity predominated, with long-suffering heroines finally achieving happiness, while villainous relatives or girls who were liars, cheats, and bullies received their comeuppance.

The strips Wee Sue and Jeannie and Her Uncle "Meanie" moved to Tammy with the merger of the two titles.

Strips 

 Angela Angel Face
 Anna and the Circus
 Anna's Forbidden Friend
 Barbara and the Ballet of the Beautiful
 Bonnie's Butler
 Brenda's Brownies — humor strip
 Captives of Terror Island
 Cinderella Superstar
 Connie Courageous
 Dancing to Danger
 Friends and Neighbours
 Jeannie and Her Uncle "Meanie" — continued in Tammy.
 Little Lady Nobody
 Lorna's Lonely Days
 Nat the Cat
 No-One Cheers for Norah
 Odd Mann Out
 Our Big Secret
 Sandra Must Dance
 The School of No Escape
 Silver is a Star
 Slaves of the Eye
 Slaves of the Trapeze
 Wendy the Witch — humor strip
 Wee Sue — Sue Strong is the midget of Milltown, but what she lacks in height she more than makes up for in brains and generosity. Sue's brains are regularly called upon when it comes to dodging her grumpy, vain, bullying, slave-driving teacher Miss Bigger and the tons of homework she always dishes out. Continued in Tammy''.

References

Sources 
 

Fleetway and IPC Comics titles
1972 comics debuts
1973 comics endings
British girls' comics
Comics magazines published in the United Kingdom